Gǀui or Gǀwi (pronounced  in English, and also spelled ǀGwi, Dcui, Gcwi, or Cgui) is a Khoe dialect of Botswana with 2,500 speakers (2004 Cook). It is part of the Gǁana dialect cluster, and is closely related to Naro. It has a number of loan words from ǂʼAmkoe.  Gǀui, ǂʼAmkoe, and Taa form the core of the Kalahari Basin sprachbund, and share a number of characteristic features, including extremely large consonant inventories.

Phonology
Gǀui has 89 consonants (with 52 clicks) or 52 consonants (and 20 clicks), depending on analysis. There are ten vowels, and two to six tones, again depending on analysis.

Clicks
Gǀui has 24 simple click consonants, plus complex clicks variously analyzed as consonant clusters or airstream contours. As with many of the Tshu–Khwe languages, clicks have lost some of their importance under the influence of neighboring Bantu languages. Many words which previously began with clicks (as shown by cognates in related languages) have lost them over the past few centuries in Gǀui. Nonetheless, Gǀui has the largest known inventory of clicks of any Khoe language.

Gǀui has been described with a contrast between velar and uvular clicks. However, all Gǀui clicks are uvular (or pharyngeal); the 'uvular' part of the latter is part of an airstream contour, a transition from a click to a non-click release: effectively, the click transitions into a non-click consonant. (See Nǁng language for a similar situation in another language.) Nakagawa proposes that the contour and glottalized clicks are not single sounds, but sequences of a click and a uvular or glottal consonant, though Miller (2011) notes that such an analysis creates problems when extended to other languages with clicks.

Altogether there are thirteen such series, or "accompaniments", and all 52 possible combinations are found. Except for the lack of bilabial clicks, the inventory is nearly identical to that of some speakers of ǂʼAmkoe, which is in intense contact with Gǀui and may have borrowed some of its clicks from Gǀui, and lost others not found in Gǀui.

Miller (2011), in a comparative study with other languages, interprets Nakagawa's description as follows.

The voiced contour ('uvular') clicks tend to be prenasalized, .
As in the majority of languages with clicks, the glottalized nasal series  are pronounced with a glottal release  in initial position, and prenasalized  after a vowel. The contrast between glottalized oral and glottalized nasal clicks is unusual, but has also been reported from ǂʼAmkoe and Yeyi since Nakagawa announced its discovery in Gǀui. The Khute dialect of Gǀui also has preglottalized nasal clicks allophonically.  They developed from glottalized nasal clicks before pharyngealized vowels, perhaps under ǂʼAmkoe influence:

Other consonants

Most words are of the form CV, CVV, CVCV, CVN, where C stands for a consonant, V for a vowel, and N for a nasal consonant (m, n). In CVCV words, only a limited set of consonants may occur in medial position (the second syllable). Of these, two may not occur at the beginning of a word, and due to restrictions with nasal vowels may be argued to be allophonic. The  is pronounced  after a lateral click or a pharyngeal vowel (but not after a velar ejective ).  only occurs in mimesis.  occurs in a single word, t'aa 'to carve', which is not widely known.

The palatals, which are unique among Khoisan languages to Gǁana-Gǀui, derive historically from the alveolars before non-pharyngealized vowels. In Gǁana this shift has only partly occurred.

Vowels
Gǀui has five modal vowels, three nasal vowels, and two pharyngeal vowels, . Gǀui also has breathy-voice vowels, but they are described as part of the tone system.

Only the five modal vowels  occur in monomoraic (CV or V) roots, which except for the noun χò 'thing, place, case' are all grammatical morphemes. These are reduced to three nasal vowels  after nasal consonants, including the glottalized nasal clicks.

The modal vowels and the pharyngeal vowels, occur as the first vowel (V1) of bimoraic roots, CVCV, CVV, and CVN, though the modal vowels are reduced to  before a nasal coda, CVN.

The modal and nasal vowels (but not the pharyngeals) occur as the second vowel (V2) of bimoraic roots, CVCV or CVV, though only modal vowels may follow the medial consonants , and only nasal vowels follow the medial consonants . Either oral or nasal vowels may follow  or null (CVV roots).

The initial consonant (C1) may be any but . The medial consonant (C2) may be . N may be .

There are other vowel restrictions. V1 is always i in CVCV words when C1 is non-click palatal, for example. Uvular(ized) consonants cause vowel lowering.

Tone
Gǀui may be analyzed as having two abstract phonemic tones, plus breathy voice, which is covered here rather than under vowels.

Monosyllabic morphemes carry one of two tones, high and low. Bimoraic roots carry one of six tones: high-level, high-mid (or "high falling"), mid-low (or "mid"), low-mid dipping/rising, high falling (or "falling"), and low falling (or "low"). Low falling and low-mid are accompanied by a breathy voice phonation, the other four with a clear phonation. The high and low falling tones form a natural class, triggering for example a high tone on the suffix -si, whereas the other four root tones trigger a low tone on -si.

That is, there are two tones on CV and V roots; two tones on bimoraic roots with breathy vowels, one of them falling; and four tones on bimoraic roots with other vowels, one of them falling. Thus there are four phonemic tones on CVCV, CVV, and CVN roots, the number expected if there are two possible tones on each mora, with moraic N carrying tone, though their contours are not simple juxtapositions of high/low + high/low.

Dialect
 Khute

References

 Nakagawa, Hirosi. 1995. "A Preliminary Report on the Click Accompaniments in ǀGui". Journal of the International Phonetic Association, 25.2, 49–63.
 Nakagawa, Hirosi. 1996. "An Outline of ǀGui Phonology". African Study Monographs, Suppl. 22, 101–124.
 Nakagawa, Hirosi. 2006. Aspects of the phonetic and phonological structure of the Gǀui language. Ph.D. dissertation, University of Witwatersrand.

External links
Gǀui basic lexicon at the Global Lexicostatistical Database

Khoe languages
Languages of Botswana

ru:Лъгана-цъгви